Rodica Ciorănică-Gavriliţă (born 25 March 1976) is a journalist and editor from Moldova. She founded VIP Magazin in 2004. Since 2007, she has had a TV show on Pro TV Chişinău and then on Prime TV. Rodica Ciorănică is the head of VIP Magazin Grup. Besides VIP Magazin, she edits two other magazines, 50 cei mai influenti Moldoveni (The 50 most influential Moldavians) and 99 femei din Moldova (99 women from Moldova). She is married to Sergiu Gavriliţă (their marriage godfather being Sergiu Mocanu) and they have a daughter.

Awards 
 Premiul „Managerul anului 2007” oferit de Centrul Independent de Jurnalism și Comitetul pentru Libertatea Presei
 Premiul „Speranța anului în jurnalism”, oferit de CIJ, 1998
 Premiul VIP 2004 pentru „Cel mai reușit debut în presa scrisă”,
 Premiul „Iurie Matei” pentru Jurnalism, 2006.

References

External links 
 Rodica Cioranica: I am a personality which doesn’t like printings…
 Archive VIP Magazin

1976 births
People from Cantemir District
Moldovan journalists
Moldovan women journalists
Moldovan writers
Moldovan women writers
Living people